Topspin Media (or Topspin) is a technology company that provides direct-to-consumer retail and marketing software for musicians, filmmakers, artists, authors, and other content creators. It was founded in 2007 by Peter Gotcher and Shamal Ranasinghe. The Topspin application includes integrated tools for e-commerce, fan relationship management, marketing, and fulfillment of both digital and physical goods. The company was acquired by Beats Music in 2014.

History 
Topspin was founded in 2007 by Peter Gotcher (co-creator of Pro Tools) and Shamal Ranasinghe. In 2008, Topspin was named Indie Visionary of the Year by Billboard magazine. Early on, Topspin's software was available to artists by invitation only. The company gradually engaged new clients, field-testing new features by managing direct-to-consumer campaigns for artists like David Byrne and Brian Eno. In 2010, Topspin made waves by introducing a newly developed ticketing system and helping the Pixies sell out two fan-only shows at The Troxy in London, England. In February 2011, CEO Ian Rogers announced that the company would open up its then-private software to the public. On March 16, 2011, the Topspin platform officially became available to the general public. The company promoted its long-awaited public launch heavily at the South By Southwest music festival, hosting a three-day software demo and awarding a $5,000 "Direct-to-Fan Grant" to the artist presenting the most compelling direct-to-fan marketing plan. Topspin has since maintained a notable presence at industry conferences such as MIDEM and South By Southwest. In October 2011, Topspin was named one of four initial partners of YouTube's Merch Store integration. In March 2012, it was announced that Topspin's e-commerce and marketing technology would power MTV Networks' Artists.MTV venture, scheduled to launch in Summer 2012. Topspin Media is headquartered in Santa Monica, California, and maintains satellite offices in New York, Nashville, and London, England.

Features 
The Topspin is a web-based application organized into six primary sections or tabs: Dashboard, Products, Promote, Fans, Sell, and Fulfill. When Topspin users log in, they arrive at an account Dashboard, which offers an overview of their recent sales and marketing data. The Products section is where users create, bundle, and manage assets in their catalog. The Promote section offers tools for online promotion and fan acquisition. The Fans section allows for managing and organizing a user's acquired fan base. The Sell section is where Topspin users create e-commerce "offers" in order to sell goods from their Products catalog. Offers can be made publicly available automatically via an artist's built-in Topspin Store (Spinshop) or can be embedded directly in any website. The Fulfill section is primarily an orders management interface for receiving and processing customer orders.

Among Topspin's most notable features is the ability to package multiple products together for sale as unified bundles. For instance, a single package can simultaneously contain a CD, T-shirt, concert ticket, album download, and other products. The bundling of physical and digital products has at times been cited as an effective method for preserving value amidst shrinking music industry revenues. Topspin CEO Ian Rogers has called the strategy of combining digital and physical goods "rebuilding". Rogers offered some insight into the physical vs. digital debate in February, 2012, reporting that while the number of physical and digital units sold through Topspin are approximately equal, the majority (75%) of revenue generated by Topspin artists can be attributed to sales of physical merchandise.

Other notable features of the Topspin platform include:

 Topspin Store (or "Spinshop") – a customizable, hosted, embeddable store available to all users.
 Email for Media widget – an embeddable tool that collects fan email addresses in exchange for free downloads.
 Redemption codes – randomized or vanity-style codes for secure free download campaigns.
 Membership – allows users to limit access to store offers to fan club members only.
 Automated Digital Preorders – users can specify future digital delivery dates and instant gratification products for specific offers.
 Digital Ticketing – tickets can be scanned with Topspin's accompanying iPhone app.
 Product bundling – the ability to package multiple products together for sale as bundles.
 Topspin Fulfillment – an integrated worldwide fulfillment solution available to all Topspin users.

Clients and users 
At the time of Topspin's public launch in March, 2011, the company's artist roster numbered somewhere between three and four thousand users. By March, 2012, one year after its public launch, Topspin's roster was approaching 20,000. Among past and present Topspin users, notable artists include:

 Alexz Johnson
 Paul McCartney
 Linkin Park
 Eminem
 Beastie Boys
 Arcade Fire
 Trent Reznor
 The Smashing Pumpkins
 Noel Gallagher
 Kanye West
 Kevin Smith
 Pixies
 Sigur Rós
 Daughtry
 DJ Shadow
 Dead Can Dance
 Universal Music Group artists
Tyler, The Creator
 Atlantic Records artists
 Maroon 5
 David Byrne with Brian Eno (Everything That Happens Will Happen Today) and St. Vincent (Love This Giant)

References

External links
 Interview with Ian Rogers about Topspin, HitQuarters Jul 2010

Apple Inc. acquisitions
Music companies of the United States
Software companies established in 2007
Defunct software companies of the United States